Àlex Corretja was the defending champion but lost in the second round to Werner Eschauer.

Guillermo Coria won in the final 6–1, 6–4, 6–2 against Nicolás Massú.

Seeds
A champion seed is indicated in bold text while text in italics indicates the round in which that seed was eliminated. All sixteen seeds received a bye to the second round.

  Juan Carlos Ferrero (quarterfinals)
  Guillermo Coria (champion)
  Rainer Schüttler (second round)
  Albert Costa (second round)
  Younes El Aynaoui (third round)
  Mikhail Youzhny (second round)
  Gastón Gaudio (quarterfinals)
  Juan Ignacio Chela (quarterfinals)
  Mariano Zabaleta (semifinals)
  Max Mirnyi (third round)
  Nikolay Davydenko (third round)
  Àlex Corretja (second round)
  Feliciano López (semifinals)
  Sargis Sargsian (third round)
  Flávio Saretta (third round)
  David Sánchez (second round)

Draw

Finals

Top half

Section 1

Section 2

Bottom half

Section 3

Section 4

References
 2003 Generali Open Draw

Austrian Open Kitzbühel
2003 ATP Tour